The Samoa Time Zone or Samoa Standard Time (SST) observes standard time by subtracting eleven hours from Coordinated Universal Time (UTC-11:00). The clock time in this zone is based on the mean solar time of the 165th meridian west of the Greenwich Observatory.

The zone includes the U.S. territory of American Samoa, as well as the Midway Islands and the uninhabited islands of Jarvis, Palmyra, and Kingman Reef. It also includes the country of Niue.

The zone is one hour behind Hawaii-Aleutian Time Zone and one hour ahead of the Howland and Baker islands, and 23 hours behind Wake Island Time Zone.

The nation of Samoa also observed the same time as the Samoa Time Zone until it moved across the International Date Line at the end of 29 December 2011; it is now 24 hours (25 hours in southern hemisphere summer) ahead of American Samoa.

Populated areas 
Pago Pago, American Samoa

See also
Time zone
Time offset
Chamorro Time Zone
Wake Island Time Zone
Hawaii-Aleutian Time Zone
Central Time Zone
Eastern Time Zone
Atlantic Time Zone
Newfoundland Time Zone

Sources
 Current time around the world

Time zones
Time zones in the United States